The Colley Matrix is a computer-generated sports rating system designed by Dr. Wesley Colley. It is one of more than 40 polls, rankings, and formulas recognized by the NCAA in its list of national champion selectors in college football. Though it was created in 1998, its retroactive selections since 1992 are recognized by the NCAA.

Methodology
In his initial paper at Princeton University, Colley states, "The method is based on very simple statistical principles, and uses only Div. I-A wins and losses as input — margin of victory does not matter. The scheme adjusts effectively for strength of schedule, in a way that is free of bias toward conference, tradition, or region." Colley claims that his method is bias free for estimating the ranking of a team given a particular schedule. The resulting values for each team are identified as a ranking, thus being a realization of Pierre-Simon Laplace’s Rule of Succession.

The formula was adjusted in 2007 to account for games against FCS teams.

National champions
As an NCAA-designated major selector, the NCAA regards the following teams as Colley's national champion selection.

In five years (1997, 2011, 2012, 2016, 2017) the Colley Matrix selected a national champion that did not win the Bowl Alliance, BCS, or CFP national championship game. In each of the years, the Colley Matrix was the only NCAA-designated "major selector" to select that champion.

† Years in which Colley Matrix selection did not win BCS or CFP national championship game.

History
The Colley Matrix was one of the computer rankings used during Bowl Championship Series (BCS) system of determining national championship game participants. Added in 2001, the Peter Wolfe and Wes Colley/Atlanta Journal-Constitution computer rankings were used in place of The New York Times and Dunkel rankings. The change was made because the BCS wanted computer rankings that did not depend heavily on margin of victory.

In 2018, the Mountain West Conference moved away from using four polls, one being Colley Matrix, to determine the host site for its conference championship game in football, due to "a shift to place a priority on head-to-head competition."

The Colley Matrix has chosen a different national champion from the Bowl Alliance, BCS, or College Football Playoff (CFP) champion five times:
 1997 — Colley Matrix ranked Tennessee first, Michigan second, and Nebraska third, despite Nebraska defeating Tennessee 42–17 in the 1998 Orange Bowl (used as the Bowl Alliance championship game that season) and Tennessee having two losses while Nebraska and Michigan were both undefeated. Most NCAA recognized selectors including the Coaches Poll chose Nebraska as the champion that season, while the AP Poll and all other selectors besides the Colley Matrix chose Michigan. Tennessee was ranked No. 7 in the final AP Poll and No. 8 in the final Coaches Poll.
 2011 — Colley Matrix ranked Oklahoma State as first, although the team did not play in the 2012 BCS National Championship Game and finished No. 3 in both the AP Poll and Coaches Poll.
 2012 — Colley Matrix ranked Notre Dame as first and Alabama second despite the Crimson Tide defeating the Fighting Irish 42–14 in the 2013 BCS National Championship Game.
 2016 — Colley Matrix ranked Alabama first and Clemson second despite Clemson beating Alabama 35–31 in the 2017 College Football Playoff National Championship.
 2017 — Colley Matrix ranked UCF first, while UCF finished No. 6 in the AP Poll and No. 7 in the Coaches Poll. UCF was not selected for the 2018 College Football Playoff despite being the only undefeated FBS team that season, albeit with a much weaker strength of schedule than the teams picked above them (103 at the end of the regular season, while playoff semifinalists Clemson, Oklahoma, Georgia, and Alabama's strength of schedules ranked 38, 24, 27, and 34, respectively).
In each of the above instances, the Colley Matrix was the only NCAA recognized selector to choose a champion other than the BCS or CFP winner.

Criticism and controversies 
The methodology of the rankings have been questioned by others on the grounds of subjectivity and specifics of the statistical math. It has also been criticized for not correctly emphasizing a team's strength of schedule, head-to-head results, and for problems with the formula used for the calculation.

In the final BCS rankings for the 2010 season, LSU was incorrectly ranked ahead of Boise State, at No. 10 instead of No. 11. The error was a result of Colley failing to input an FCS playoff game (Appalachian State vs. Western Illinois) correctly, a mistake that affected an order that helped determine bowl pairings that season.

Since created in 1992, the four instances where the Colley Matrix has chosen a different national champion from the BCS/CFP winner are the most of any NCAA recognized selector in that timeframe. Colley Matrix is also the only NCAA recognized selector to ever choose a different champion than the CFP (in use since the 2014 season), which it has done twice.

Colley Matrix is a special case of the Generalized row sum method, a parametric family of ranking methods developed by P.Yu. Cheboratev (1989).

Notes

References

External links
 

College football rankings
College men's basketball rankings in the United States
Rating systems